The phrase Big Bang, used in reference to the sudden deregulation of financial markets, was coined to describe measures, including abolition of fixed commission charges and of the distinction between stockjobbers and stockbrokers on the London Stock Exchange and change from open outcry to screen-based electronic trading, effected by UK Prime Minister Margaret Thatcher in 1986.

History
Big Bang was the result of an agreement in 1983 by the Thatcher government and the London Stock Exchange to settle a wide-ranging antitrust case that had been initiated during the previous government by the Office of Fair Trading against the London Stock Exchange under the Restrictive Trade Practices Act 1956. These restrictive practices included the London Stock Exchange's rules establishing fixed minimum commissions, the "single capacity" rule (which enforced a separation between brokers acting as agents for their clients on commission and jobbers who made the markets and theoretically provided liquidity by holding lines of stocks and shares on their books), the requirement that both brokers and jobbers should be independent and not part of any wider financial group, and the stock exchange's exclusion of all foreigners from stock exchange membership.

The day the London Stock Exchange's rules changed on 27 October 1986 was dubbed "Big Bang" because of the increase in market activity expected from an aggregation of measures designed to alter the structure of the financial market.

The effect of Big Bang led to significant changes to the structure of the financial markets in London. The changes saw many of the old firms being taken over by large banks both foreign and domestic and would lead in the following years to further changes to the regulatory environment that would eventually lead to the creation of the Financial Services Authority.

Consequences
The effects of Big Bang were dramatic, with London's place as a financial capital decisively strengthened, to the point where in 2006 it was arguably the world's most important financial centre. The boom resulted in the relocation of institutions into new developments in the nearby Isle of Dogs area, particularly that of Canary Wharf.

Although the "Big Bang" eased stock market transactions there is a debate in the UK about how far it affected the Financial crisis of 2007–2008. 

In 2010, Nigel Lawson, Margaret Thatcher's Chancellor of the Exchequer at the time of Big Bang, appeared on the BBC Radio Four programme Analysis to discuss the banking reform. 

During the programme, Nigel Lawson is reported as having 'converted to the Glass-Steagall cause' [of separating retail banking from investment banking], due to concerns of moral hazard ("[banks] are not going to be as careful and as cautious and as prudent as they should be") and banks being 'Too Big To Fail' (at taxpayers expense, as seen during the Financial crisis of 2007–2008).

During the programme, the presenter, Edward Stourton says, "Lord Lawson isn't alone in his admission that [through the 'Big Bang'] we walked into the new banking world without really understanding the risks involved" [by ending the separation of high street banks and merchant banks].  Nigel Lawson muses, "I didn't give it a great deal of thought at that time. I'd taken for granted that separation, as by custom and practice we'd had that all those years (we'd always had it), but it was a completely unforeseen consequence of the stock exchange reforms".

John Reed (a former Citigroup banker) says that, “we were simply ignorant of the risks that we were getting into” (from the repeal of Glass-Steagall in 1999).  He attributes its repeal (in the United States) as being due to his customers (“big international institutions”) wanting to issue commercial paper, instead of borrowing directly from banks, as well as from the Big Bang, due to “globalised markets” and “inter-connected capital markets” making it difficult when there is one regime in London and a different one in New York.

In 2011 former British Prime Minister Gordon Brown expressed regret at not implementing tougher regulations during his tenure of chancellor between 1997 and 2007, responding to "relentless pressure" from the City not to over-regulate.

Similar events 
Subsequent similar actions, such as the deregulation of the Japanese financial markets circa 1997, have analogously also been tagged with the phrase Big Bang.

See also
 Wimbledon Effect

References

1986 in economics
1986 in the United Kingdom
Economy of London
Economic liberalization
Economics of regulation
Financial markets
London Stock Exchange
Separation of investment and retail banking